Qanat Sorkh (also Romanized as Qanāt Sorkh) is a village in Sarchehan Rural District, Sarchehan District, Bavanat County, Fars Province, Iran. At the 2006 census, its population was 165, in 38 families.

References 

Populated places in Sarchehan County